Sochy may refer to:

 Sochy, Warmian-Masurian Voivodeship
 Sochy, Lublin Voivodeship